Michael Thomas (born June 4, 1987) is a former American football wide receiver. He was drafted by the Jacksonville Jaguars in the fourth round of the 2009 NFL Draft. He played college football at Arizona.

Early years
Thomas attended DeSoto High School in DeSoto, Texas. As a senior, he had 15 receptions for 205 yards as a receiver and 333 yards on 26 carries as a running back.

College career
Thomas attended the University of Arizona from 2005 to 2008. While there he started 39 of 48 games and set the school and Pac-10 record for receptions with 259 for 3,231 yards and 23 touchdowns.

Professional career

2009 NFL Draft

Jacksonville Jaguars
Thomas was drafted by the Jacksonville Jaguars in the fourth round of the 2009 NFL Draft. As a rookie, he started four of the 14 games in which he played, and had 48 receptions for 453 yards and a touchdown. His 48 receptions were tied with Michael Crabtree for fourth among all rookies.

A key play of his career was in a 2010 Week 10 game against the Texans. With just 3 seconds remaining in regulation and the game tied at 24, QB David Garrard launched a "Hail Mary" pass from the 50-yard line intended for Mike Sims-Walker.  The ball was batted down at the goal line by Texans DB Glover Quin, and then hit Thomas in the chest.  Thomas was able to grab the ball next to his left knee before it hit the ground, and he took a step forward into the end zone for the game-winning touchdown.

On October 30, 2012, Thomas was traded to the Detroit Lions for a 2014 fifth round draft pick.

Detroit Lions
Thomas was cut by the Lions on August 19, 2013.

Arizona Cardinals
On August 20, 2013, Thomas was signed by the Arizona Cardinals. He was released on August 30, 2013.

Houston Texans
Thomas signed with the Houston Texans on December 30, 2013. On August 31, 2014, Thomas was released.

Toronto Argonauts
Thomas was signed by the Toronto Argonauts on November 21, 2014. He was released by the Argonauts on May 13, 2015.

References

External links
Jacksonville Jaguars Bio
Toronto Argonauts bio 
Arizona Wildcats bio

1987 births
Living people
Sportspeople from Bossier City, Louisiana
People from DeSoto, Texas
Sportspeople from the Dallas–Fort Worth metroplex
Players of American football from Louisiana
Players of American football from Texas
American football wide receivers
Arizona Wildcats football players
Jacksonville Jaguars players
Detroit Lions players
Arizona Cardinals players
Houston Texans players